John Duvall may refer to:

 John Duvall (mayor), mayor of Indianapolis
 John Duvall (artist) (1816–1892), English artist